Nansana is a town in the Central Region of Uganda. It is located in the Wakiso District and is one of the five municipalities in the district. Nansana is a municipal council comprising four Divisions; Nansana Division, Nabweru Division, Gombe Division, and Busukuma Divisions. The four Divisions are considered as lower local government independent units.

Location
Nansana is located on the main highway between Kampala and Hoima, the Kampala-Hoima Road. The coordinates of the town are 0°21'50.0"N, 32°31'43.0"E (Latitude:0.363889; Longitude:32.528611).

Population
In 2002, the national population census put Nansana's population at 62,044. In 2010, the Uganda Bureau of Statistics (UBOS) estimated the town's population at 86,200. In 2011, UBOS estimated the mid-year population at 89,900. In 2014, the national population census put the population at 365,124.

In 2020, the mid-year population of Nansana was projected at 532,800. It is calculated that the population of the municipality grew at an average annual rate of 6.68 percent, between 2014 and 2020.

Overview
Nansana is a high-density working-class neighborhood. Beginning in May 2017 a crime wave engulfed the town, involving the murder of young women in their 20s and 30s. As of 4 August 2017, a total of 10 young women have been murdered in Nansana, after being sexually molested. None of the murders have been solved.  The local politicians have disagreed on what needs to be done. There are reasons to believe that some of the victims were engaged in prostitution and were killed when they disagreed with their customers. Ian Kyeyune, the Resident District Commissioner (RDC) for Wakiso District proposes to license all prostitutes in the town so that they are accorded protection by the government. However, Regina Bakitte, the mayor of Nansana, opposes the idea, arguing that this would encourage promiscuity in the town. Prostitution is illegal in Uganda.

See also
List of cities and towns in Uganda

References

Wakiso District
Populated places in Central Region, Uganda
Cities in the Great Rift Valley